Fraser & Isham Law Office, also known as Christopher Law Office, is a historic law office building located at Fowler, Benton County, Indiana. It was built in 1896, and is a one-story, rectangular Romanesque Revival style red brick building. It features mansard and conical roofs and two rounded bays on the front facade. A flat roofed rear addition was erected in 1952.

It was listed on the National Register of Historic Places in 2000.

References

Commercial buildings on the National Register of Historic Places in Indiana
Romanesque Revival architecture in Indiana
Office buildings completed in 1896
Buildings and structures in Benton County, Indiana
National Register of Historic Places in Benton County, Indiana
1896 establishments in Indiana
Law offices
Legal history of Indiana